Rafael Zamarripa Castañeda (born February 8, 1942) is a Mexican painter, sculptor, designer, dancer and choreographer.

Zamarripa's paintings, sculptures, and choreography have been called distinct and recognizable. He is considered one of Mexico's most prominent contemporary artists. Zamarripa's students have called him the father and master of folklórico dance.

Early life and education
Zamarripa was born in 1942 in Guadalajara, Jalisco, Mexico, to Francisco ‘Don Panchito’ Zamarripa,  a shoemaker, and Maria de Luz Castañeda, who loved to play the piano. He has described them as ‘strict, but loving parents.’ His family, including his six other siblings, was poor, but always had food and clothing. 

Zamarripa discovered his interest and talent in art at an early age; as a child he was amazed by puppets and he eventually started making his own. He used sticks, paper, and cardboard to make the puppets and he dressed them with fabric.  At the age of eight his parents sent him to work with a santero (sculptor of religious wooden figures). Here, he started practicing his sculpting skills. 

Around this time Zamarripa would also help his father sell shoes downtown. On his way downtown, he would pass Teatro Degollado, which intrigued him. Returning from downtown, he would linger at the building to play with the stage crew's children.  He enrolled in the school at age fourteen. The school's music department offered a Mexican folk dance class in the summer, composed primarily of female students who were in need of male dance partners. Zamarripa, along with other students from the art department, joined and he began dancing there with no formal training. When summer classes ended, the dance students wanted to continue dancing on their own, so they formed a local student group that met every Saturday.  They practiced regional folk dances, traditional jarabes, and sones, taught to them by María del Refugio García Brambila and Francisco Sanchez Flores.

After completing a degree in art and education in Mexico, Zamarripa took advanced art courses in Italy, New Zealand, and Australia.

Career
At the age of 18, Zamarripa was hired to sculpt The Boy on the Seahorse, which has become one of the official symbols of the city of Puerto Vallarta. 

In 1962, Zamarripa was approached by Amalia Hernández, (who developed folkloric dance for theater, and founded Ballet Folklórico de México), after watching him dance with his student group. She invited him to join her company, but he declined because of his ambitions of pursuing a career as a sculptor. She encouraged him to reconsider, and told him it could help his art career. 

Soon after, he joined the Ballet on a trip to Europe, where they placed first at the Festival of Nations in Paris. Upon returning, he started to formalize the dance group, employing the new techniques he learned with Hernández. The group was invited to join a prestigious dance competition, entering as El Grupo de Danza Regional de la Escuela de Artes Plásticas. They brought Zamarripa with them to teach them how to perform on stage. The group placed first regionally in Jalisco and continued to Mexico City to compete at the national level, where their director allowed them to call themselves El Grupo Folklórico de la Universidad de Guadalajara. 

When his group returned to Guadalajara, the director realized Zamarripa's potential as a producer and a director, equating his staging abilities with those of Amalia Hernández. A few years later, Zamarripa formed El Grupo Folklórico de Guadalajara, which would define and set the standard for traditional folkloric dance.  

In 1966 Zamarripa also established the Escuela de Danza at the University of Guadalajara, becoming its first director.

In 1980, he created the Centro de Danza Universitaria at the University of Colima, one of the first universities to offer a bachelor's degree in Mexican folkloric dance. 

In 2000, Zamarripa completed a series of sketches to be featured in the book Trajes de Danza Mexicana, a collaboration with Xochitl Medina Ortiz. The book, published in 2001, contains detailed illustrations and descriptions of the folk dance attire of each of the 32 Mexican states. 

In 2010, Olga Nájera-Ramirez wrote, directed, and produced a 50-minute documentary the focused on Mexican folklórico dance through the life and accomplishments of Zamarripa. The film, Danza Folklórica Escénica, showcased Zamarripa's choreography and artwork.

Today, his paintings and sculptures adorn buildings and parks in Jalisco and Colima, such as the bronze relief structure on the Teatro Degollado and the León en el Árbol sculpture in Guadalajara's Plaza Tapatia. He has been a maestro and choreographer for different folk dance groups in Mexico and the United States, and has showcased his choreography around the world. He is currently the director of the Ballet Folklórico de la Universidad de Colima and Chair of the Department of Dance in the Instituto Universitario de Bellas Artes at the University of Colima.

Work
Zamarripa has founded several major dance companies including the award-winning Grupo Folklórico de la Universidad de Guadalajara and Ballet Folklórico de la Universidad de Colima.  His contributions to the Mexican folk dance genre include the presentation of corridos (narrative ballads) on stage, the raza technique (a teaching method that uses drums to perfect dancers' footwork), and the creation of the culebra dance prototype (the Snake Dance). 
He has directed many types of dance, including regional dances from Mexico, Pre-Hispanic dances, ritual dances, indigenous dances, and corridos.  Zamarripa strives to retain the cultural and historical roots of the dances he choreographs. He has attended workshops, conferences, and universities in Mexico and the United States to assist folkloric dance groups and offer his expertise.

Awards and notability
The National Sculptor Prize (1960)
First Place in Festival of Nations (Paris, 1961)
 Received honors (medal, parchment, $50,000)  from the Fundación Pedro Sarquís Merrewe in Guadalajara for work in visual arts and dance (2007)

References

http://www.olganajera.com/
http://www.latarea.com.mx/articu/articu0/sonia0.htm

Living people
1942 births
Artists from Guadalajara, Jalisco
Mexican sculptors
Male sculptors
Mexican painters
Mexican choreographers